This is a list of the chicken breeds usually considered to be of French origin. Some may have complex or obscure histories, so inclusion here does not necessarily imply that a breed is predominantly or exclusively from France. Not all of these breeds have existed continuously since they were first described; some, like the Pavilly, Merlerault and Caumont, became extinct in the early twentieth century and were later recreated.

Extinct breeds
 Ardeale
 Blanzac
 Chrisantheme
 Cocherelle
 Contres
 Coucou de France
 Coucou Picarde
 Coucou Soie
 Favoris
 Ivanaise
 Malgache
 Poule de Caux
 Poule de Marquise
 Poule de Saint-Omer
 Poule des Courrières
 Poule Lorraine
 Provençale

References 

Chicken